Barpeta (Pron: bə(r)ˈpeɪtə / bə(r)ˈpi:tə ) is a town in Barpeta district of the state of Assam in India and is district headquarters. It is also called Satra Nagari (Temple town) of Assam due to the presence of various Vaishnavite Satras in the vicinity.

Geography
It has an average elevation of 35 metres (114 feet). It is 40 km away from Manas National Park. Three rivers - Chaulkhowa, Mora Nodi (Dead River) and Nakhanda, both of which are tributaries to Brahmaputra run through the town.

History
The Barpeta was earlier known as 'Tatikuchi', where Tati stands for weaver and Kuchi means cluster of villages in native Barpetia dialect, i.e. the land of weavers. In ancient times, it was central part of erstwhile ancient Kamrup, included in Kamapitha of Kamarupa Pithas, the ancient divisions of old Kamrup region. In nineteenth century, Barpeta town and adjoining areas became part of Undivided Kamrup district, as Barpeta subdivision. In 1983, the subdivision attained district status.

Forestry
Barpeta is the gateway to Manas National Park, one of the National Parks of Assam and one of the few tiger reserves of India.

Demographics

Hindus form the majority of the town's population, followed by Muslims.
 India census, Barpeta had a population of 42,649. Population of Children within age of 0-6 is 3673 which is 8.61% of total population of Barpeta. The female Sex Ratio is of 1008 against state average of 958. Moreover, Child Sex Ratio in Barpeta is around 994 compared to Assam state average of 962. Literacy rate of Barpeta city is 90.77% higher than state average of 72.19%. In Barpeta, Male literacy is around 94.86% while female literacy rate is 86.73% .

Bengali is spoken by 23,827 people, Assamese is spoken by 6,193, hindi by 4242, Bodo by 884 and 7,503 people speak other languages. Most of these people are Bengali Hindus and Muslims, Assamese people, Hindi speaking people and others. Bengali, Assamese and Hindi are the major languages spoken in the town.

Climate
Barpeta has subtropical climate, with chilly winters and hot humid summers. However, people here can enjoy both winter and hot. On a hot day, sometimes in this city after 35 high C to 39 High C warm.

Politics
Barpeta is part of Barpeta (Lok Sabha constituency).
Indian president Fakaruddin Ali Ahmed was an MLA from Jania LAC and MP from the Barpeta constituency. Syed Abdur Rouf, A.F Golam Osmani and other prominent persons represented Barpeta in the constitutional assembly. Standing MLA of Jania LAC Abdul Khaleque (Assamese politician) has been elected to the Loksabha in 2019.  There 7 nos of Assembly Constituency in the district. Those are Jania, Baghbar, Sorbhog, Sarukhetri, Bhabanipur, Chenga and Barpeta .

Transport
The nearest railway station, airport and port is Barpeta Road, Lokpriya Gopinath Bordoloi International Airport and Dhubri respectively.
Barpeta town is connected to National Highway 31 through Howly, and National Highway 427 via Hajo-Doulashal connects it to Guwahati.

Education
Barpeta has very good educational environment. The town has produced so many noble figures of Assam. Few of them are Ambikagiri Raichoudhury, Banikanta Kakati, Mahendra Mohan Choudhry and Purushottam Das. Some of the well known higher educational institutions of Barpeta are Barpeta Vidyapith Higher Secondary School, Kendriya Vidyalaya Barpeta, Madhab Choudhury College and Barpeta Girls' College. It also has the fifth medical college of Assam, the Fakhruddin Ali Ahmed Medical College and Hospital.

Notable people
Ambikagiri Raichoudhury, poet and nationalist
Banikanta Kakati, linguist
Chandra Bharati, poet
Colonel Guruprasad Das, inventor of vacuum brakes for trains
Fakhruddin Ali Ahmed, fifth President of India
Kalpana Patowary, singer
Mahendra Mohan Choudhry, fourth chief minister of Assam
Rameshwar Pathak, Kamrupi Lokgeet singer

References

External links
 Official District Website
 Barpeta's Job Site Voice Of Barpeta

 
Cities and towns in Barpeta district

ar:باربتا
bpy:বড়পেটা
new:बर्र्या